Prunus pullei is a species of Prunus native to the highlands of New Guinea. It is a small tree, usually 15m but reaching 24m tall, with rough, lenticellate brown bark (occasionally gray). At higher altitudes it takes on a more shrubby growth form.

Description

Its stiff-coriaceous leaves are elliptic to oblong, 1.5 to 5cm wide and 2 to 12cm long. Their bases are acute to rounded, with often revolute margins (when living), and obtuse, often retuse apices. There are 5 to 9 pairs of nerves, looped and joining close to the margin. The young leaves are densely hairy and usually remain hairy beneath when mature. There are usually two (occasionally four) flat basal glands. Its free stipules are narrowly triangular, 0.7 to 1.8mm wide by 2.5 to 7mm long. 

The flowers have 15 to 40 stamens with glabrous filaments up to 7mm long, and anthers 0.4 to 1 mmlong. The ovaries are densely hairy, with (sometimes) basally hairy styles up to 5mm long. The fruits are subglobular to transversely ellipsoid, 6 to 11mm by 7 to 11.5mm, with hairy exocarps and glabrous (or with some hairs inside) endocarps. When ripe the fruits are shining purplish-black, possessing a calyx (the remnant of the hypanthium) underneath the fruit 1.5 to 4 mm in diameter. In specimens from higher altitudes this calyx is enlarged up to 8mm in diameter. Its seeds have glabrous testa.

References

pullei
Flora of New Guinea
Plants described in 1965